Cinangka is a small town in the Depok, West Java, Indonesia founded in the 1980s.

Cinangka District has administrators called Camat.

or it could be a small village in Sawangan, Depok, Jawa Barat and "Lurah" as its administrator.

Facilities
Cinangka has the following facilities:
Public Market
Masjids
Schools
Administrators Office

Education
Nurul Fikri Boarding School is located in Cinangka.

Serang Regency
Districts of Banten
Populated places in Banten